Behdan (also Romanized as Behdān; also known as Beidan and Bendan) is a village in Eslamabad Rural District, Sangar District, Rasht County, Gilan Province, Iran. At the 2006 census, its population was 1,227, in 324 families.

References 

Populated places in Rasht County